Ulick Nally was a parish priest, who worked around 1680 - 1697.

Background

Due to the impact of the Penal Laws on late seventeenth-century Ireland, Catholic priests who celebrated the mass could be hung and severe penalties, up to the death penalty, could be imposed upon those who supported priests. O'Conor of Sylane, Tuam, received a letter from a Catholic bishop recommending "a poor way-worn man in the gear of a servant" for a position in his house. Recognizing Nally as a priest, "O'Conor engaged him on the spot as a servant, taking care that there should be witnesses of the hiring for his own security." By these means, Nally became one of the few priests who worked without prosecution.

The base of the stone cross upon the mass rock reads "UN P.P. H O'CONOR 1680."

References

 Another Corofin Bishop from Sylane: Dr. Thomas O'Connor, Bishop of Achonry, by Liam Ó Mainnín and Seán Ó Cuinneagáin, in Sylane National School 150th Anniversary, ed. John Lardner, Margaret Murray, Phil Moran, Tuam, 2002.

People from County Galway